Gol Khandan or Golkhandan may refer to:
Gol Khandan, Chenaran, Razavi Khorasan Province
Gol Khandan, Dargaz, Razavi Khorasan Province
Gol Khandan-e Jadid, Tehran Province
Gol Khandan-e Qadim, Tehran Province